Agrarian Reform Law may refer to:
Roman Agrarian law
Agrarian Reform Law (Albania), of 1945
Agrarian Reform Law (Cuba), of 1959
Agrarian Reform Law (Nicaragua), of 1979
Agrarian Reform Law (Bolivia), decreed in August 1953
Agrarian Reform Law (Syria), decreed in 1958, 1962, 1963 and in 1967
Latvian Land Reform of 1920